This article is a list of male, female and national teams world champions in foosball.

The International Table Soccer Federation (ITSF) has held a World Championships annually or bi-annually, with the winning players and teams recognised as the best international multi-table players and teams of that period. World Series events are held for ITSF-recognised tables (Leonhart, Garlando, Bonzini, Roberto Sport and Tornado), usually annually.

In the United States, the World Championships are held on the Tornado table, with previous events having been organised on the Dynamo and Tournament Soccer tables.

ITSF World Championships and World Cup Champions
In 2015, it was decided to host this event every two years instead of annually.

The column Home table always means player's or team's choice in the finals of the tournament.

Winners of Open Singles and Open Doubles at (Tornado, Dynamo, Tournament Soccer) World Championships

ITSF WCS (World Championship Series) Champions

References

External links
 www.foosworld.com Tournament Calendar
 IFP (USA) Tournament Calendar
 www.foosball.com
 www.table-soccer.org
 A history by Bruce Nardoci

Table football
Table football